The Fibonacci Association is a mathematical organization that specializes in the Fibonacci number sequence and a wide variety of related subjects, generalizations, and applications, including recurrence relations, combinatorial identities, binomial coefficients, prime numbers, pseudoprimes, continued fractions, the golden ratio, linear algebra, geometry, real analysis, and complex analysis.

History
The organization was founded in 1963 by Brother Alfred Brousseau, F.S.C. of St. Mary's College (Moraga, California) and Verner E. Hoggatt Jr. of San Jose State College (now San Jose State University).

Details regarding the early history of The Fibonacci Association are given Marjorie Bicknell-Johnson's "A Short History of The Fibonacci Quarterly", published in The Fibonacci Quarterly 25:1 (February 1987) 2-5, during the Twenty-Fifth Anniversary year of the journal.

Publications
Since the year of its founding, the Fibonacci Association has published an international mathematical journal, The Fibonacci Quarterly .

The Fibonacci Association also publishes Proceedings for its international conferences, held every two years since 1984.  The 2008 conference, formally entitled the Thirteenth International Conference on Fibonacci Numbers and Their Applications, took place at the University of Patras (Greece), preceded by conferences at San Francisco State University (USA, 2006), Technische Universität Braunschweig (Germany, 2004), Northern Arizona University (USA, 2002), and Institut Supérieur de Technologie (Luxemburg, 2000).

The 2010 Conference was held at the Instituto de Matemáticas de la UNAM, Morelia, Mexico, as announced at the Fibonacci Association website:  .  The 2012 Conference will take place during June 25–30 at the Institute of Mathematics and Informatics, Eszerházy Károly College, Eger, Hungary, with keynote speaker Neil Sloane, founder of the Encyclopedia of Integer Sequences.

External links
The Official website of the Fibonacci Association
The Fibonacci Quarterly
Up-to-date list of issues of The Fibonacci Quarterly

Fibonacci numbers
Organizations established in 1963
Mathematics organizations
1963 establishments in California